Anthela pudica is a moth of the family Anthelidae first described by Charles Swinhoe in 1902. It is found in Australia.

References

Moths described in 1902
Anthelidae